Thomas Jefferson De Angelis (November 30, 1859 – March 20, 1933), born  in San Francisco was an American century stage actor who specialized in comedy and acrobatic clowning and who achieved fame in vaudeville and on Broadway. He was also a stage director and producer. He began in Baltimore at age 10. Near the end of his life he appeared in the hit 1927 Broadway play The Royal Family by Edna Ferber. He sporadically appeared in silent films, mostly shorts. He wrote his 1931 autobiography, A Vagabond Trouper, with Alvin E. Harlow.

Gallery

References

External links 

 
 
 

1859 births
1933 deaths
American male stage actors
Male actors from San Francisco